Julian Franklin Everett (October 5, 1869 – January 13, 1955) was an American architect known for the buildings he designed in Seattle, Washington. His work includes a synagogue for the Temple de Hirsch congregation (1908) and the Pioneer Square Comfort Station and Pergola in Seattle (1909), now a historic landmark. Some of his works, including the temple and a building for Pathé Exchange, were later demolished, while others are listed on the National Register of Historic Places (NRHP).

Early life and career
Everett was born on October 5, 1869 in Leeds, Wisconsin. He studied at the University of Wisconsin, the Massachusetts Institute of Technology, and at Syracuse University.

Everett moved to Montana in 1902, where he designed the John R. Toole House in Missoula, now a Kappa Kappa Gamma sorority house. He moved to Seattle in 1904 where he designed several commercial buildings, churches and homes for prominent citizens.

Personal life and later years
Everett was a member of Phi Delta Theta fraternity and a freemason. He was married to Edith. He moved to Ventura, California in 1920 and in 1944 he relocated from Vista, California to Los Angeles. He died in Los Angeles on January 13, 1955, and a service was held for him at Chapel of the Pines Crematory.

Work

John R. Toole House ca. 1902 for John R. Toole at 1005 Gerald Ave. Missoula, Montana. It became the Kappa Kappa Gamma sorority house, NRHP listed
Temple de Hirsch, 15th Ave. and E. Union St., Seattle.

Third United Presbyterian Church (1905)
Pilgrim Congregational Church (1906)
Fire House No. 23 (1909) in Seattle with Frank Lindstone Baker
Pioneer Square Comfort Station and Pergola in Seattle, now known as the Pioneer Square pergola, (1909) in Seattle's Pioneer Square -  Skid Row Historic District. It is NRHP listed #71000875 as well as with the nearby totem pole and Pioneer Building as ID #77001340

Redelsheimer—Ostrander House, (1910–1914) 200 40th Ave. E., Seattle. NRHP listed, a 2-story brick veneer building
Julius Redelsheimer residence (1906)
George A. Smith house (1905)
 Mrs. N.O. Reichart House (1908) in Seattle
 Seattle Cracker & Candy Co. Factory (1912) in Seattle
Leamington Hotel & Apartments (with W.R.B. Wilcox, 1916) at 317 Marion Street in Seattle. Reopened in 1995 as the Pacific Hotel with 112 units of affordable housing and recognized with the Outstanding Achievement Award in Historic Preservation by the Washington State Historic Preservation Officer
White Motor Company Building on auto row in Capitol Hill. The terracotta-clad building was constructed in 1917 and is a City of Seattle Landmark. Everett is credited with William R. Kelley as the architect
 Kelly-Springfield Motor Truck Co. (1917) in Seattle 
Colyear-Motor Sales Co./ White Motor Co. (1918 with W.R. Kelley) in Seattle

 A building at 2025 3rd Ave. in Seattle constructed for Pathé Exchange. This  was demolished in 2016.

References

19th-century American architects
1869 births
1955 deaths
People from Leeds, Wisconsin
University of Wisconsin–Madison alumni
Massachusetts Institute of Technology alumni
20th-century American architects
Architects from Wisconsin